Norfolk, Colorado is an unincorporated location in Larimer County, Colorado.  It is the nearest community to Lindenmeier site, a National Historic Landmark.

Geography of Larimer County, Colorado